Cayetano 'Caye' Quintana Hernández (born 20 December 1993) is a Spanish professional footballer who plays for Śląsk Wrocław as a forward.

Club career
Born in Isla Cristina, Huelva, Andalusia, Quintana started playing as a senior with lowly Isla Cristina FC in 2010. In the 2011 summer he moved to Recreativo de Huelva, being assigned to the reserves in Tercera División.

In January 2014 Quintana was loaned to Segunda División B's Écija Balompié for the remainder of the campaign. He featured regularly for the side, and returned to Recre in June.

On 23 August 2014 Quintana made his debut as a professional, coming on as a late substitute in a 0–0 home draw against Real Zaragoza in the Segunda División championship. He scored his first goal in the category on 1 March of the following year, netting the game's only in a home win against Racing de Santander.

On 10 July 2015, Quintana signed for Real Valladolid, being assigned to the B-side in the third division. He subsequently represented fellow third division sides Racing de Santander, RCD Mallorca B and FC Jumilla before returning to Recre on 2 July 2018.

On 22 June 2019, after scoring a career-best 18 goals, Quintana signed a three-year contract with Cádiz CF in the second division. The following 15 January, he moved to fellow league team CF Fuenlabrada on loan for the remainder of the campaign.

On 7 September 2020, Quintana joined fellow second division side Málaga CF also in a temporary deal.

References

External links

1993 births
Living people
Sportspeople from the Province of Huelva
Spanish footballers
Footballers from Andalusia
Association football forwards
Segunda División players
Segunda División B players
Tercera División players
Ekstraklasa players
Atlético Onubense players
Écija Balompié players
Recreativo de Huelva players
Real Valladolid Promesas players
Real Valladolid players
Racing de Santander players
RCD Mallorca B players
FC Jumilla players
Cádiz CF players
CF Fuenlabrada footballers
Málaga CF players
Śląsk Wrocław players
Expatriate footballers in Poland